Anomalomyrma is an Asian genus of ants in the subfamily Leptanillinae. The genus was originally described in 1990 with the type species Anomalomyrma taylori, based on a single dealate queen from Borneo. Workers were unknown until 2011, when two new species were described from Peninsular Malaysia and the Philippines.

Species
 Anomalomyrma boltoni Borowiec, et al. 2011 – Cameron Highlands, Peninsular Malaysia
 Anomalomyrma helenae Borowiec, et al. 2011 – El Nido region of Palawan, Philippines
 Anomalomyrma taylori Bolton, 1990 – Kinabalu Park, Sabah, Malaysia

References

External links

Leptanillinae
Ant genera
Hymenoptera of Asia